Shrimp Louie is a traditional salad from California made with shrimp, lettuce, egg and tomato. The dressing is similar to Thousand Island dressing and is made with mayonnaise, ketchup, chili sauce, Worcestershire sauce, onion, salt, and pepper. Shrimp Louie originated in San Francisco in the early 1900s. A variation on the salad includes avocado. A version  made with crab is known as Crab Louie.

See also
 List of salads

References

Shrimp dishes
Salads
Cuisine of the San Francisco Bay Area
History of San Francisco